Mohammed Al Abidi (born January 15, 1987) is a Yemeni footballer who played at 2011 AFC Asian Cup qualification as a forward.

References

Living people
Yemeni footballers
Yemen international footballers
Association football forwards
Place of birth missing (living people)
Shabab Al Baydaa players
Al-Wehda Club (Sana'a) players
Al Sha'ab Ibb players
Yemeni League players
1987 births